Jean Audard (20 March 1913 – 19 March 1998) was a French poet and critic.

Life
In the late 1920s, he cofounded a poetry magazine Rationale (1928-1930) with other young poets, as well as founding Zarathoustra, a more philosophical journal. Around this time he became a correspondent of Oscar Milosz.

In the 1930s he was a contributor to Cahiers du Sud, and joined others associated with Surrealism in anti-Fascist efforts. An essay by Audard on the extent to which psychoanalysis was materialist drew heavy criticism from Georges Politzer for the 'bootlegging Bergsonianism' of its 'Freudo-Marxism'. He wrote for the wartime (1939-1946) poetry magazine Messages. After the death of Oscar Milosc he became Director of the Friends of Milosz, established in 1966.

He had three children. Elsa is a psychoanalyst in Paris. Frédéric, the youngest, created his own communication agency in the East of France. And his second daughter is Catherine Audard, a philosopher and translator of John Rawls.

Works
 'Hécate de Jouve', Cahiers du Sud (April 1929), pp. 231–3
 'Bergson : les Deux Sources de la morale et de la religion', Cahiers du Sud (June 1932)
 'La Psychanalyse et le destin de la Poésie', Cahiers du Sud 144 (October 1932)
 Review of Oswald Spengler's Decline of the West, Cahiers du Sud, 1932
 'Du caractère matérialiste de la psychanalyse', Cahiers du Sud 154 (September 1933), pp. 517–528.
 'La poésie et les événements', Cahiers du Sud 166 (November 1934), pp. 725–31
 'La crise de l'idéalisme romantique dans la philosophie de Schopenhauer', in  Cahiers du Sud 194 (May–June 1937), ed. Georges Camille as Le Romantisme Allemand
 'Blake et la Revolution', Messages 1 (1939), p. 15-19
 'Le modernisme de Coleridge', in Nestor Miserez et al., ed., Le Romantisme Anglais, 1946
 (tr.) 'Le poème de l'Ancien Marin (fragment)' by Samuel Taylor Coleridge, in Nestor Miserez et al., ed., Le Romantisme Anglais, 1946
 'Sur l'influence de Mallarmé', in Jean Audard & Pierre Missac, ed., Stephane Mallarme:  Inédits, poèmes et lettres, études, Paris: Les Lettres, 1948
 Le Poete de l'ame, in O. V. de L. Milosz (1877-1939), Paris: Éditions André Silvaire, 1959, p. 84
 'Hommage à Jean Cassou', Cahiers De l'Association Les Amis de Milosz 25 (1986)

References

1913 births
1998 deaths
20th-century French poets
French literary critics
French male poets
20th-century French male writers
French male non-fiction writers